Kingstone is a village and civil parish within the English county of Staffordshire.

Population 
The 2011 census recorded a population of 629 in 249 households. The parish comes under the East Staffordshire Non-Metropolitan District.

Governance
Kingstone is the main settlement in Kingstone Civil Parish which also includes The Blythe and Gratwich.

Kingstone is part of the Bagots ward in the East Staffordshire Borough Council and is represented by Conservative Greg Hall. The Uttoxeter Rural ward in Staffordshire County council is represented by Philip Atkins who is also Conservative.

Kingstone is part of the Lichfield constituency and is represented by the Conservative Michael Fabricant. In Europe it was part of the West Midlands constituency and is represented by 6 MEPs.

Public Services
Waste collection services are provided by East Staffordshire Borough Council. Water and sewage services are provided by South Staffordshire Water. The distribution network operator for electricity is Central Networks, better known as E.ON UK.

Kingstone uses a Stoke-on-Trent (ST) postcode and the Postal Town is Uttoxeter. The nearest Library is located in Uttoxeter. Kingstone uses the Uttoxeter (01889) area code.

The nearest police and fire stations are in Uttoxeter.

History
Kingstone became a village in 1862 with the building of the parish church the population has remained almost static since then.

Listed Buildings 
There are 14 listed buildings and structures within the parish. This includes two mileposts. All of these structures have been designated a Grade II listing.

Kingstone is the home of the Earl of Shrewsbury since 1924. Kingstone is also the resting place of Simon Degge who is the former High Sheriff of Derbyshire.

Culture and Recreation
Kingstone has a Public house called The Shrewsbury Arms or The Shrew.

Kingstone has a large playing field, tennis court and a play area on Whitehall Close

Education
Kingstone has a small Primary School called Talbot First School which is used by children up to the age of 8.

Kingstone uses the Uttoxeter Middle School system and years 5–8 attend Oldfields Hall Middle School in Uttoxeter and the areas senior school is Thomas Alleyne's High School which is also in Uttoxeter.

The areas Further education colleges are Burton College and Stafford College.

Transport
There are 2 bus stops in the village and is served by route 428.

The Stafford and Uttoxeter Railway used to run parallel to the village and there was a station at nearby Grindley that closed in 1939.

Today the Nearest Railway stations are Uttoxeter  and Rugeley Trent Valley .

The nearest airports are East Midlands  and Birmingham .

Media
The local Newspapers covering the area are The Uttoxeter advertiser and The Uttoxeter Post and Times.

Kingstone Receives BBC West Midlands and ITV Central television. Local radio stations in the area are BBC Radio Derby, BBC Radio Stoke, Touch and Signal 1.

See also
Listed buildings in Kingstone, Staffordshire

References

Villages in Staffordshire
Borough of East Staffordshire